Antigonish Harbour  is a community  and harbour in the Canadian province of Nova Scotia, located in Antigonish County, first settled in 1784 by disbanded soldiers loyal to the British side in the American Revolution.

References

External links
 Antigonish Harbour Watershed Association

Communities in Antigonish County, Nova Scotia